Ectoedemia liguricella is a moth of the family Nepticulidae. It is found in the western part of the Mediterranean region, where it is known from the Italian Riviera, France, Spain and Morocco. It occurs from sea-level to high elevations in the mountains

The wingspan is 7.6–9 mm. Adults have been caught from May to September.

It is thought that, unlike most other Nepticulidae species, the larvae mine the bark of their host, rather than the leaves. The host plant is unknown, but they might feed on Quercus species, since it has often been collected amongst those trees. In one of the localities near Marbella, bark mines on Quercus coccifera were recorded, which could belong to this species.

External links
Fauna Europaea
A Taxonomic Revision Of The Western Palaearctic Species Of The Subgenera Zimmermannia Hering And Ectoedemia Busck s.str. (Lepidoptera, Nepticulidae), With Notes On Their Phylogeny

Nepticulidae
Moths of Europe
Moths of Africa
Moths described in 1953